The following is a list of gospel blues musicians.

Danny Brooks
Pearly Brown
Edward W. Clayborn 
Ashley Cleveland
Reverend Gary Davis
Thomas A. Dorsey
Blind Roosevelt Graves
Vera Hall
Son House
Bo Weavil Jackson
Blind Lemon Jefferson
Blind Willie Johnson
Glenn Kaiser
Booker T. Laury
Bishop Dready Manning
Darrell Mansfield
Sister Gertrude Morgan
Charlie Patton
Washington Phillips
D.C. Rice
Boyd Rivers
Robert Bradley's Blackwater Surprise
Eugene Smith
Blind Joe Taggart
Sister Rosetta Tharpe
Bukka White
Josh White
Elder Roma Wilson
Robert Wilkins
Zora Young

References

See also
List of soul-blues musicians

Gospel
Gospel
 
Gospel blues